SPAA Fringe was an interactive seminar organised every year, over two days, by the Screen Producers Association of Australia (SPAA). The SPAA Fringe usually takes place in October.

SPAA Fringe represents an opportunity for everyone involved in the Film and TV industry, such as producers, directors, writers, animators, distributors, broadcasters, legal firms, post-production companies and funding agencies to improve their understanding of the industry, acquire new skills as well as spend time with experts of the industry, consequently enlarging their network of contacts.

SPAA Fringe is characterized by workshops, roundtables, one-on-one sessions, panel discussions, film screenings and social networking events. Previous interesting speakers consisted of Rick McCallum, Producer Star Wars Ep I-III; Andrew Mason, Producer The Matrix; Amy Hobby, Producer Secretary; Peter Broderick, specialist in low budget, digital distribution.

SPAA Fringe final year was 2012.

See also
SPAA Conference
Screen Producers Australia

Notes

Film organisations in Australia